Kalmarz (also Romanized as Kālmarz; also known as Kalmare and Kālmūz) is a village in Belesbeneh Rural District, Kuchesfahan District, Rasht County, Gilan Province, Iran. At the 2006 census, its population was 348, in 100 families.

References 

Populated places in Rasht County